Charles William Jones (18 June 1893 - 19 January 1960) was a Welsh international rugby union player, between 1922 and 1923 he played 29 matches for Leicester Tigers.

Career

He made his Leicester Tigers debut on 16 December 1922 in a 16 all draw against Bristol at Welford Road. He was a regularly for the rest of the 1922/23 season featuring in 20 of the remain 28 games that season, including the historic game in Paris against Racing, the club's first overseas game. His final appearance for the club was on  November 1923 against Llanelli.

References

1893 births
1960 deaths
Leicester Tigers players
Rugby union flankers
Rugby union players from Cardiff
Wales international rugby union players
Welsh rugby union players